Right Right is a 2016 Telugu film, directed by Manu, with lead roles starring Sumanth Ashwin, and Pooja Jhaveri. It was produced by J. Vamsi Krishna, with music composed by Jeevan Babu. It is the remake of Malayalam film, Ordinary.

Plot 
Ravi, is a youngster who had always dreamed of being a cop but turns out to be a bus conductor in a small village. He quickly makes friends with all the fellow villagers including the village headmaster, his friend's daughter, Amrutha, (who he raised), who is a fiance to Deva, the headmaster's real son. He also makes friends with a fellow villager, Bhadram, and the driver of his bus, Seshu. He also falls in love with a fellow villager, Kalyani, who also has feelings for Ravi. One fine day, Seshu is drunk and asks Ravi to drive the bus. Ravi accidentally crashes intro someone and gets him onto a vehicle. Ravi finds a bag and takes it home. Ravi and Seshu open it and find a photo of him and his family with his father being the headmaster, and him being Deva.

The next day, Ravi and Seshu inquire in all the hospitals nearby but find no dead body admitted in an accident case the previous night. The police then come that night and say that they found a dead body which turns out to be Deva's. Ravi and Seshu are shocked and keep looking for the vehicle driver but fail to find him. One day. Kalyani takes a letter form Deva's bag that Ravi was reading, thinking that it was hers. Ravi tries to snatch the letter from her but fails and Kalyani drops it. Amrutha finds it and starts crying. The whole village come and Bhadram beats up Ravi. Ravi then gets arrested. Seshu then sees the vehicle driver and gets Ravi out on bail. Ravi and Seshu chase and catch the driver and figure out the truth. They bring him into the middle of the village and tell him to tell him the truth to all the other villagers. Bhadram then comes and tries to kill him and Ravi reveals that he is the actual culprit. It is then revealed that Bhadram had had feelings for Amrutha since childhood and killed Deva after figuring out that he was her fiance. Deva lands right in front of Ravi's bus and falls down thereby Ravi not crashing into him. The driver and Bhadram escape together and  stop on a bridge as they almost crash into Amrutha. Bhadram forces Amrutha to come with him and the villagers all then come to the bridge. Bhadram takes Amrutha as hostage and no one comes to save her. With everyone not caring and coming near him, Bhadram realizes that he can't kill her and jumps off the bridge. The film ends with Ravi marrying Kalyani and Ravi and Seshu having another bus post together.

Cast 
 Sumanth Ashwin as Ravi 
 Prabhakar as Seshu
 Pooja Jhaveri as Kalyani
 Nassar as Venu Master
 Pavani Gangireddy as Amrutha
 Vinodh as Bhadram
 Thagubothu Ramesh as Ravi's friend
 Dhanraj
 Shakalaka Shankar as Drama Rao
 Karuna Bhushan
 Jaya Vani
 Jeeva
 Sudha as Ravi's mother
 Rajyalakshmi
 Bharath Reddy as Bhaskar
 Meesam Suresh

Production 
The film's first look was released on 10 November 2015.

Soundtrack

Release
Right Right was released on 10 June 2016 across Telangana and Andhra Pradesh. The movie was declared as a flop.

References

External links
 
 
 

2016 films
2010s Telugu-language films
Telugu remakes of Malayalam films